Shane Nelson may refer to:
 Shane Nelson (American football) (born 1955), former American football player
 Shane Nelson (fighter) (born 1984), American mixed martial artist